The 1996 Torneo Descentralizado was the 81st season of the top category of Peruvian football. A total of 16 teams competed in the tournament. Sporting Cristal won its 13th first division title, completing a string of 3 consecutive titles starting in 1994. The feat is known as a tricampeonato and was only accomplished before by Alianza Lima.

Changes from 1995
The tournament would be played like in 1994, where the champion was crowned after the first stage of the tournament and the second berth to the Copa Libertadores was determined by an end-of-season Liguilla featuring 4 teams.
Four teams were relegated instead of the customary two. Two teams from the Copa Perú and the Segunda División in their place.

Teams

First stage
The first stage of the season was played as a double round-robin tournament. Sporting Cristal as champions qualified for the 1997 Copa Libertadores. Alianza Lima directly advanced to the end-of-season Liguilla and received a bonus point for placing second. The teams that placed 3 to 8 advanced to a preliminary round.

Pre-Liguilla

Universitario, Deportivo Pesquero, and Cienciano qualified for the Liguilla.

Liguilla
All matches were played in Lima.

References

External links
RSSSF Peru 1996 by Eli Schmerler, José Luis Pierrend

Peru
Football (soccer)
Peruvian Primera División seasons